Arriva Colchester (formerly Network Colchester) is a bus company operating services around Colchester. It is a subsidiary of Arriva. The company was, until March 2015, part of the Tellings-Golden Miller company, which was owned by Arriva at the time, under the name of Network Colchester.

History

Network Colchester's origins can be traced to 1904 with the establishment of Colchester Corporation Tramways, operating at its peak, four routes and 18 trams. Bus operation commenced in 1928 as Colchester Corporation Transport to replace the trams. To comply with the Transport Act 1985 in 1986 the assets were transferred to a new legal entity, Colchester Borough Transport.

In 1993, during a bus war with Eastern National, the company was sold to British Bus for £1, but the new owners took on considerable debts. After discussions the bus war ended in 1994 with a share out of routes between the two companies. In August 1996 British Bus was purchased by the Cowie Group, which in November 1997 was renamed Arriva, with  Colchester Borough Transport being rebranded as Arriva Colchester. The tuscan red and cream livery was replaced by Arriva corporate colours. Profits did not improve and in 2004 the company was sold to Tellings-Golden Miller, placed under the control of Burton's Coaches and rebranded as Network Colchester.

In 2008 Tellings-Golden Miller was sold to Arriva resulting in it once again owning the Colchester services. It continues to trade as Network Colchester. In early 2010 the Burton's Coaches business was sold to Yellow Star Travel Services in a management buy out but ownership of Network Colchester remained with Tellings-Golden Miller.

Depots

The depot was at Magdalen Street, Colchester until March 2008 when relocated to expanded premises at Heath Business Park, Grange Way in the Old Heath district of Colchester. The depot was later used by First Essex, but in November 2018 sold for redevelopment.

References

External links

Company website

Colchester
Bus operators in Essex
Transport companies established in 1904
1904 establishments in England